Henry Edward Hubbick (12 November 1910 – 18 March 1992) was an English footballer who played professional football for Burnley, Bolton Wanderers, Port Vale, and Rochdale either side of World War II.

Career
After leaving school Hubbick worked as a coal miner. In his free time he played football for Jarrow, Blyth Spartans and Spennymoor United before signing for professional club Burnley in 1935. Hubbick made his debut for Burnley on 19 October 1935 in a 1–0 win over Nottingham Forest and went on to make 32 appearances for the club that season. He scored his first goal for the club in a 2–2 draw with Manchester United on 10 April 1936. Hubbick kept his place in the side going into the 1936–37 season and missed only one match in the first five months of the campaign. He played his last Burnley match on 6 February 1937 in a 3–1 defeat to Southampton at Turf Moor. In February 1937, he left Burnley and joined Bolton Wanderers, moving up from the Second Division to the First Division.

Bolton finished one place and two points above the relegation zone in 1936–37. They then rose to seventh position in 1937–38 and then eighth place in 1938–39. With the outbreak of World War II football was cancelled and Hubbick went back to work in the pits, also guesting for Blackpool, Bury and Blackburn Rovers. Immediately after the war, Bolton manager Walter Rowley made him club captain. He led the club to an 18th-place finish in 1946–47.

Hubbick joined Gordon Hodgson's Port Vale for a £1,000 fee in October 1947. He played 30 Third Division South games in 1947–48, before making 21 league and cup appearances in 1948–49. He scored only his second goal in the Football League for the "Valiants" in a 3–0 win over Leyton Orient at The Old Recreation Ground on 25 December 1948.

He was sold on to Rochdale in January 1949 for around £1,000, where he finished his professional career in 1950, at the age of 40. Ted Goodier's "Dale" finished seventh in the Third Division North, and then third in 1949–50. After leaving Spotland with 90 league appearances to his name, he later played for Lancaster City as a player-coach before moving on to Welsh clubs Caernarvon Town, Llandudno and Rhyl Athletic. He later worked as Preston North End's physiotherapist.

Career statistics
Source:

References

1910 births
1992 deaths
Sportspeople from Jarrow
Footballers from Tyne and Wear
English miners
English footballers
Association football fullbacks
Jarrow F.C. players
Blyth Spartans A.F.C. players
Spennymoor United F.C. players
Burnley F.C. players
Bolton Wanderers F.C. players
Blackpool F.C. wartime guest players
Bury F.C. wartime guest players
Blackburn Rovers F.C. wartime guest players
Port Vale F.C. players
Rochdale A.F.C. players
Lancaster City F.C. players
Caernarfon Town F.C. players
Llandudno F.C. players
Rhyl F.C. players
English Football League players
Association football coaches
Preston North End F.C. non-playing staff